Anatoly Aleksandrovich Vasilyev (born in 1946) is a Soviet and Russian film and theater actor, People's Artist of Russia (1994).

Biography 
Anatoly Vasilyev was born November 6, 1946 in Nizhny Tagil.
In 1969, Anatoly Vasilyev graduated from the Moscow Art Theatre School (course Vasily Markov). At the end of the school-studio has been accepted into the troupe Moscow Satire Theatre,  where he served until 1973. In 1973 he moved to Russian Army Theatre. Since 1995 he has served as a Mossovet Theatre.

He acted in over 50 films (Scream Loons,  The Case of General Shubnikov,  Mikhailo Lomonosov,  Waiting for Love,  Ladie's Tango, I Want to — Fall in Love  and others). The most famous roles — Air Crew and TV series Svaty.

Personal life 
 His first wife (1969-1983) — Tatyana Vasilyeva
Son of actor Philipp Vasilyev (1978) 
Grandchildren Ivan  and Grigory
His second wife (1991) — Vera Vasilyeva 
Daughter Varvara Vasileva (1992)

Selected filmography
 1978 — Ivantsov, Petrov, Sidorov as Vladik Yakovlev
 1978 — Steppe as Dymov
 1979 — Air Crew as Valentin Nenarokov, the co-pilot
 1980 — The Сase of General Shubnikov as Major-General Nikolay Shubnikov
 1981 — Waiting for Love as Slava, physician for the recruitment commission
 1983 — Ladies' Tango as Fyodor
 1986 —  Boris Godunov as Pyotr Basmanov
1986 — Mikhailo Lomonosov as  Vasily Dorofeyevich, Lomonosov's father
 1997 —  At the Dawn Misty Youth as Bashkirtsev
 2001 —  Lyubov.ru as Kalinin
 2004 — Daddy as  Ivan Kuzmich Chernyshov
 2007 — Tatiana's Day as Oleg Barinov
 2008 — Fathers and Sons as Nikolai Petrovich Kirsanov
2008-10 — Svaty as Yury Anatolievich Kovalev
2012 — The Military Prosecutor's Office as Sergey Smirnov
2013 — Owl Creek as Valentin Petrovich Bakur,  The Count

References

External links

 Anatoly Vasilyev on KinoPoisk

1946 births
Living people
People from Nizhny Tagil
Russian male film actors
Russian male stage actors
Russian male television actors
Soviet male film actors
Soviet male stage actors
Soviet male television actors
Honored Artists of the RSFSR
People's Artists of Russia
Moscow Art Theatre School alumni